The Saxophone Concerto, Op. 14, is a three-movement concertante composition for alto saxophone and string orchestra written in 1934 by the Swedish composer Lars-Erik Larsson. The piece premiered on 27 November 1934 in Norrköping, Sweden, with  conducting the Norrköping Orchestral Association. The soloist was the German-born American virtuoso Sigurd Raschèr, its dedicatee, whom Larsson had consulted during the compositional process; as such, the concerto incorporated a number of Raschèr's pioneering techniques—"highly personal tricks and devices". Because the Saxophone Concerto proved too difficult for most soloists (and was therefore oft-neglected), Larsson "simplified" it in the early 1980s in order to make it more accessible.

Structure
The Saxophone Concerto is in three movements. They are as follows:

Instrumentation
The Saxophone Concerto is scored the following instruments:

Soloist: Alto saxophone (in E)
Strings: violins, violas, cellos, and double basses

 published the piece in 1953.

Recordings
The sortable table below lists commercially available recordings of the Saxophone Concerto:

Notes, references, and sources

 
 

Compositions by Lars-Erik Larsson
20th-century classical music
Classical music in Sweden
1934 compositions
Saxophone concertos